Jay Thomas (born Jon Thomas Terrell; July 12, 1948 – August 24, 2017) was an American actor, comedian, and radio personality. He was heard in New York from 1976–1979 on top-40 station 99X, and later on rhythmic CHR station 92KTU, and in Los Angeles beginning in 1986 on KPWR "Power 106", where he hosted the station's top-rated morning show until 1993. His notable television work included his co-starring role as Remo DaVinci on Mork & Mindy (1979–1981), the recurring role of Eddie LeBec, a Boston Bruins goalie on the downside of his career, on Cheers (1987–1989), the lead character of newspaper columnist Jack Stein on Love & War (1992–1995), and a repeat guest role as Jerry Gold, a talk-show host who becomes both an antagonist and love interest of the title character on Murphy Brown. He won the Primetime Emmy Award for Outstanding Guest Actor in a Comedy Series in 1990 and 1991 for portraying Gold.

In 1997, he starred in the television film Killing Mr. Griffin, based on the eponymous novel. In films, he co-starred in Mr. Holland's Opus as a high-school coach with a flair for theatrics, and portrayed the Easter Bunny in The Santa Clause 2 and The Santa Clause 3.

He was also an annual guest on The Late Show with David Letterman during the Christmas season, where he told a story about how he met Clayton Moore, who portrayed the title character on The Lone Ranger. Beginning in 2005, he hosted The Jay Thomas Show on SiriusXM Satellite Radio channel 94 comedy greats Monday thru Thursday afternoons and Friday mornings on Howard 101.

Early life and education
Thomas was born in Kermit, Texas, to Katharine (née Guzzino) and Timothy Harry Terrell. He was raised in his Italian American mother's Catholic religion; his father was Protestant. Thomas was raised in New Orleans, where he attended and graduated from Jesuit High School. He went on to attend and graduate from Jacksonville University. Thomas was the quarterback on his high-school football team and also quarterbacked in college, a skill he later used on The Late Show with David Letterman.

Letterman appearances
Thomas made annual Christmas appearances on David Letterman's CBS late night show, beginning in December 1998. Letterman and one of his other guests that evening, then-New York Jets quarterback Vinny Testaverde, took turns throwing footballs trying to knock a large meatball off the top of a Christmas tree at the other end of the stage. As the two took turns futilely attempting to knock off the meatball, Thomas came back out to join in the festivities, and promptly knocked the meatball from the tree.

Beginning on a subsequent visit to Letterman's show, Thomas told a story about when he was a young disc jockey (around 1972) at WAYS 610 AM in Charlotte, North Carolina. Thomas had been making a promotional appearance at a local Dodge dealership, which had also booked a personal appearance by actor Clayton Moore, best known as The Lone Ranger on television and in films; Moore appeared at the event dressed in his Lone Ranger costume.

According to Thomas, he and his colleague Mike Martin, both clad in the hip fashion of the day (including tight jeans, tie-dyed shirts and their hair, which Martin wore long while Thomas himself sported what he called a "White Man's Afro"), had secretly gotten "herbed-up" (smoked  marijuana) several times throughout the day behind a dumpster. After the broadcast had ended and the crowd had left, while packing up their equipment, Thomas and Martin discovered that Moore was still there, as the car that was supposed to drive him back to his hotel never arrived; Thomas then offered Moore a ride in his own car, an old, decrepit Volvo, which Moore accepted.

While stuck in traffic, with Moore sitting quietly in the back seat, an impatient, middle-aged man backed his full-sized Buick into the front end of Thomas' compact Volvo, broke a headlight, and then drove off. An angry Thomas chased the Buick down Morehead Street weaving through heavy traffic and forgetting all about Moore still sitting quietly in his back seat. Thomas finally caught up to the man, blocked his Buick with the Volvo, and confronted him about the broken headlight. The indignant driver denied all; when Thomas threatened to call police, the man exclaimed, "Who do you think they'll believe? Me, or you two hippie freaks?" At that moment, Moore, still in costume as the Lone Ranger, stepped out of the Volvo, approached the man and said "They'll believe me, citizen!"  The man, incredulous, exclaimed "I didn't know it was you!"

For every year thereafter except 2013, Thomas appeared to repeat the Lone Ranger story, which Letterman called, "The best talk show story, ever", and once again attempt what Letterman would refer to as the "Late Show Quarterback Challenge". For his final appearance in December 2014, Thomas was again successful in knocking the meatball off the top of the tree. Thomas missed the 2013 Late Show Christmas episode due to throat surgery; John McEnroe took his place and told the Lone Ranger story, then tried, unsuccessfully, to knock the meatball off the tree by hitting tennis balls at it.

Personal life
Thomas fathered J. T. Harding in an out-of-wedlock relationship, and the child was adopted by another family in Michigan. Thomas and his son spoke about their reunion on the Dr. Phil Show. Harding was the lead singer of the band JTX and is a country-music songwriter.

Thomas married Sally Michelson in 1987. They had two sons, Samuel and Jacob.

Death
Jay Thomas died of throat cancer on August 24, 2017, surrounded by his family in Santa Barbara, California, at the age of 69.

Filmography

References

External links

 
 
 TV.com entry 
 Ten Questions with Jay Thomas

1948 births
2017 deaths
American male television actors
American male film actors
Primetime Emmy Award winners
20th-century American male actors
21st-century American male actors
Male actors from New Orleans
Male actors from Texas
Jacksonville University alumni
Jacksonville Dolphins football players
American talk radio hosts
Radio personalities from New York City
Radio personalities from Los Angeles
Radio personalities from New Orleans
American people of Italian descent
People from Kermit, Texas
Deaths from throat cancer
Deaths from cancer in California
Catholics from Texas